Sławomir Konrad Peszko (born 19 February 1985) is a Polish professional footballer who plays as a midfielder for Wieczysta Kraków.

Peszko has won championships and cup competitions in his native Poland with Wisła Płock, Lech Poznań and Lechia Gdańsk. Between 2011–2015 Peszko played abroad starting with a move to Germany with 1. FC Köln in 2011, and had short spells in England with Wolverhampton Wanderers, and Italy with Parma.

Peszko was a Polish international player for ten years from 2008–2018 and represented Poland in the 2016 Euro’s and the 2018 World Cup.

Club career
Peszko began his career in the youth ranks of Nafta Jedlicze before moving to Orlen Płock. Here, he made his professional debut on 28 August 2002 as a substitute in a Polish Cup tie against Jagiellonka Nieszawa. He made his league debut later on during the 2002–03 season and during the following campaign became a regular starter.

With Wisła Płock, he won both the Polish Cup and Supercup in 2006 and also featured for them in the qualifying rounds of that season's UEFA Cup competition. However, Płock were relegated in 2007 and Peszko remained with them for their I Liga campaign, during which he scored 16 goals in 26 appearances.

In June 2008 he returned to the top flight when he signed for Lech Poznań after his contract with Płock expired. His first season ended with him winning the Polish Cup for a second time, after he netted the only goal of the final against Ruch Chorzów. In his second season Peszko finished as the leading assist-maker in the league (with 14 assists), alongside his eight goals which helped the club win the league title.

Peszko moved to the Bundesliga in January 2011, initially signing for 1. FC Köln until the end of the season. He underwent a medical before joining the club, where it was discovered he has four kidneys. His contract was extended during the season, but his first full campaign with the club proved a troubled one as the club were relegated. Shortly before the end of the season, Peszko was arrested for drunken behaviour in a taxi, which earned him a €25,000 fine and saw him expelled from the Köln squad for their next fixture.

On 9 August 2012, Peszko joined English side Wolverhampton Wanderers on a season long loan deal. Here, he reunited with his former Köln manager Ståle Solbakken. In October 2012, he suffered a torn medial ligament that kept him out of action for three months. His first game back after the injury was a 1–0 loss against Luton Town in the FA Cup as a substitute in the 66th minute. Two hours after the defeat, Ståle Solbakken was sacked and then Peszko was deemed surplus to requirements by Dean Saunders. The season ended with Wolves getting relegated to League One and Peszko returning to Cologne.

On 31 July 2013, it was announced that 1. FC Köln had sold Peszko to the Italian club Parma, and loaned him back until the end of the 2013–14 season. After the season they got him back permanently.

He joined Lechia Gdańsk in 2015, where he won the 2018–19 Cup and 2019 Super Cup. After a final season where he made 18 appearances and scored 3 goals, in 2020 he terminated his contract due to unpaid wages.

On 15 June 2020, he joined amateur club Wieczysta Kraków on a professional deal.

International career
Peszko made his international debut for the Poland national team on 19 November 2008 in a 3–2 friendly win against the Republic of Ireland. He scored his first goal for Poland on 17 January 2010 in a 3–1 loss to Denmark.

In May 2018 he was named in Poland's preliminary 35-man squad for the 2018 FIFA World Cup in Russia.

Career statistics

Club

International

Scores and results list Poland's goal tally first, score column indicates score after each Peszko goal.

Honours
Wisła Płock
 Polish Cup: 2005–06; runner-up 2002–03
 Polish SuperCup: 2006

Lech Poznań
 Ekstraklasa: 2009–10
 Polish Cup: 2008–09
 Polish SuperCup: 2009

Lechia Gdańsk
Polish SuperCup: 2019
Polish Cup: 2019

References

External links

Official club profile

Living people
1985 births
People from Jasło
Sportspeople from Podkarpackie Voivodeship
Polish footballers
Association football midfielders
Poland international footballers
UEFA Euro 2016 players
2018 FIFA World Cup players
Wisła Płock players
Lech Poznań players
1. FC Köln players
Wolverhampton Wanderers F.C. players
Lechia Gdańsk players
Parma Calcio 1913 players
Wisła Kraków players
Wieczysta Kraków players
Polish expatriate footballers
Ekstraklasa players
Bundesliga players
2. Bundesliga players
English Football League players
Polish expatriate sportspeople in Germany
Expatriate footballers in Germany
Polish expatriate sportspeople in England
Expatriate footballers in England
Polish expatriate sportspeople in Italy
Expatriate footballers in Italy